Milford  is a small village in County Cork, Ireland. It is in the townland of Kilbolane on regional road R515, close to, but on the Cork side of, the border with County Limerick. Milford is within the Cork North-West Dáil constituency.

Milford has two pubs, a local church, an ancient castle, a primary school, a creamery, a Garda station, and a tennis court. It has scored very highly in the National Tidy Towns competition in recent years. It is located half a kilometre from Kilbolane Castle, historically the local seat of power. The local church is the Church of the Assumption of the Blessed Virgin Mary.

See also
 List of towns and villages in Ireland

References

Towns and villages in County Cork